The Circle may refer to:

Film
 The Circle (1925 film), a film directed by Frank Borzage adapted from the Somerset Maugham play
 The Circle, a 1967 documentary directed by Mort Ransen
 The Circle, a 1997 film shot in Mexico, directed by Laurits Munch-Petersen
 The Circle (2000 film), directed by Jafar Panahi
 The Circle (2005 film), directed by Yuri Zeltser; see Angela Bettis
 The Circle (2014 film), Swiss docudrama, directed by Stefan Haupt
 The Circle (2015 film), directed by Levan Akin, based on the novel by Sara Bergmark Elfgren and Mats Strandberg
 The Circle (2017 film), directed by James Ponsoldt, based on Eggers's novel

Television

Series
The Circle (franchise), a reality competition television franchise 
 The Circle (British TV series), broadcast on Channel 4 between 2018 and 2021
 The Circle (American TV series), broadcast on Netflix since 2020
 The Circle (Brazilian TV series), broadcast on Netflix in 2020
 The Circle (French TV series), broadcast on Netflix in 2020
 The Circle (TV program), an Australian morning show broadcast on Network Ten between 2010 and 2012

Episodes
 "The Circle" (Star Trek: Deep Space Nine)
 "The Circle" (Fear Itself), the last episode of the television series Fear Itself

Music

Groups
Sammy Hagar and the Circle, a 2014 music group

Albums
The Circle (Wipers album), 1988
The Circle (B'z album), 2005
The Circle (Bon Jovi album), 2009
The Circle, a 2008 album by Ragnar Zolberg

Songs
"The Circle" (song), a 1996 rock song by Ocean Colour Scene
"The Circle", a song by Circle II Circle on the album Watching in Silence
"The Circle", a song by Blackmore's Night on the album Secret Voyage
"The Circle", a song by The Dream Syndicate on the album How Did I Find Myself Here?
"The Circle", a song by Robert Forster on the album Calling from a Country Phone

Novels
The Circle Series, a series of novels by Ted Dekker
The Circle (Dekker novel), a 2010 edition that contains the Ted Dekker Circle series
The Circle (Elfgren and Strandberg novel), a young adult fantasy novel by Sara Bergmark Elfgren and Mats Strandberg
The Circle (Eggers novel), a 2013 novel by Dave Eggers

Places
 The Circle (Kingston upon Hull), a demolished cricket ground in Kingston upon Hull, England
 The Circle (Zürich Airport), a complex at Zürich Airport in Switzerland
 The Circle (Portsmouth, Virginia), a historic restaurant building in Portsmouth, Virginia
 The Circle, a colloquial name for Plaza Park (Orange, California), a public park

Other uses
 The Circle (play), a 1921 play by W. Somerset Maugham
 "The Circle" (DC Comics), a Wonder Woman story arc
 The Circle (Image Comics), an Image Comics series
 The Circle (file system), a peer-to-peer distributed file system written mainly in Python
 The Circle (magazine), a Swiss gay magazine published 1932–1967
 The Circle School, a private school in Harrisburg, Pennsylvania, United States

See also
Le Cercle, a European foreign policy think-tank
The Cyrkle, a 1960s US group
Circle (disambiguation)